

The Shavrov Sh-5 was a Soviet civil amphibian flying-boat designed by Vadim Borisovich Shavrov as a photographic platform for aerial mapping. By the time it flew it was an outdated design and the type did not enter production.

Design and development
A special committee convened to investigate the use of special aircraft for photographic survey concluded that it was desirable. To fulfil the requirements Shavrov designed the Sh-5 amphibian as a large aircraft designed to carry cameras aa well as all the equipment and crew to develop and print the images. The committee envisaged two versions; as the FS-1 landlplane and the FS-2 flying boat, (FS - Foto Samolyet – Photographic aircraft), the latter requirement was fulfilled by the Sh-5 amphibian as built in the former Richard OKB factory, GAZ-28 (GAZ - Gosudarstvenny Aviatsionnyy Zavod – state aviation plant/factory).

The Sh-5 was a cantilever high-wing monoplane amphibian flying-boat. Designed as a camera platform with glazed cabin areas it could also carry 12 passengers. It was powered by two  Shvetsov M-22 engines, (developed from license built Gnome-Rhône GR9ASB / Bristol Jupiter VI), mounted in nacelles, supported by struts, above the wing roots. It had a boat shaped fuselage bottom with a retractable landing gear and outrigger floats. Although the design work started in 1929 construction was slow, the prototype fitted with a skid landing gear first flew on 19 March 1934. With the use of military aircraft, particularly the Tupolev R-6 for aerial mapping and the fact it had become an outdated design by the time it had first flown meant the type did not enter production.

Variants
FS-1
Landplane version, not built.
FS-2
Flying boat version, not built
Sh-5
The amphibious aircraft designed by Shavrov and built at GAZ-29 to fulfil both roles. The sole prototype was in flight test when a main undercarriage strut failed. The aircraft was not repaired and later scrapped.

Specifications (Sh-5)

See also

References

Notes

Bibliography

 

1930s Soviet civil utility aircraft
Flying boats
Sh-5
Amphibious aircraft
High-wing aircraft
Aircraft first flown in 1934
Twin piston-engined tractor aircraft